The Bronze Age is a historic period, lasting approximately from 3300 BC to 1200 BC, characterized by the use of bronze, the presence of writing in some areas, and other early features of urban civilization. The Bronze Age is the second principal period of the three-age system proposed in 1836 by Christian Jürgensen Thomsen for classifying and studying ancient societies and history.

An ancient civilization is deemed to be part of the Bronze Age because it either produced bronze by smelting its own copper and alloying it with tin, arsenic, or other metals, or traded other items for bronze from production areas elsewhere. Bronze is harder and more durable than the other metals available at the time, allowing Bronze Age civilizations to gain a technological advantage.

While terrestrial iron is naturally abundant, the higher temperature required for smelting, in addition to the greater difficulty of working with the metal, placed it out of reach of common use until the end of the second millennium BC. Copper and tin ores are rare, since there were no tin bronzes in Western Asia before trading in bronze began in the 3rd millennium BC. Worldwide, the Bronze Age generally followed the Neolithic period, with the Chalcolithic serving as a transition.

Bronze Age cultures differed in their development of writing. According to archaeological evidence, cultures in Mesopotamia (cuneiform script) and Egypt (hieroglyphs) developed the earliest practical writing systems.

Metal use 

The period is characterized by the widespread use of bronze, even if only by elites in its early part, though the introduction and development of bronze technology were not universally synchronous. Human-made tin bronze technology requires set production techniques. Tin must be mined (mainly as the tin ore cassiterite) and smelted separately, then added to hot copper to make bronze alloy. The Bronze Age was a time of extensive use of metals and of developing trade networks (See Tin sources and trade in ancient times). A 2013 report suggests that the earliest tin-alloy bronze dates to the mid-5th millennium BC in a Vinča culture site in Pločnik (Serbia), although this culture is not conventionally considered part of the Bronze Age. The dating of the foil has been disputed.

Near East 

Western Asia and the Near East were the first regions to enter the Bronze Age, which began with the rise of the Mesopotamian civilization of Sumer in the mid-4th millennium BC. Cultures in the ancient Near East (often called one of "the cradles of civilization") practiced intensive year-round agriculture, developed writing systems, invented the potter's wheel, created centralized governments (usually in form of hereditary monarchies), written law codes, city-states and nation-states and empires, embarked on advanced architectural projects, introduced social stratification, economic and civil administration, slavery, and practiced organized warfare, medicine and religion. Societies in the region laid the foundations for astronomy, mathematics and astrology.

 Dates are approximate, consult particular article for details

Anatolia 

The Hittite Empire was established in Hattusa in northern Anatolia from the 18th century BC. In the 14th century BC the Hittite Kingdom was at its height, encompassing central Anatolia, southwestern Syria as far as Ugarit, and upper Mesopotamia. After 1180 BC, amid general turmoil in the Levant conjectured to have been associated with the sudden arrival of the Sea Peoples, the kingdom disintegrated into several independent "Neo-Hittite" city-states, some of which survived until as late as the 8th century BC.

Arzawa in Western Anatolia during the second half of the second millennium BC likely extended along southern Anatolia in a belt that reaches from near the Turkish Lakes Region to the Aegean coast. Arzawa was the western neighbor—sometimes a rival and sometimes a vassal—of the Middle and New Hittite Kingdoms.

The Assuwa league was a confederation of states in western Anatolia that was defeated by the Hittites under an earlier Tudhaliya I, around 1400 BC. Arzawa has been associated with the much more obscure Assuwa generally located to its north. It probably bordered it, and may even be an alternative term for it (at least during some periods).

Egypt

Early Bronze dynasties 

In Ancient Egypt, the Bronze Age begins in the Protodynastic period,  3150 BC. The archaic Early Bronze Age of Egypt, known as the Early Dynastic Period of Egypt, immediately follows the unification of Lower and Upper Egypt,  3100 BC. It is generally taken to include the First and Second Dynasties, lasting from the Protodynastic Period of Egypt until about 2686 BC, or the beginning of the Old Kingdom. With the First Dynasty, the capital moved from Abydos to Memphis with a unified Egypt ruled by an Egyptian god-king. Abydos remained the major holy land in the south. The hallmarks of ancient Egyptian civilization, such as art, architecture and many aspects of religion, took shape during the Early Dynastic Period. Memphis in the Early Bronze Age was the largest city of the time.
The Old Kingdom of the regional Bronze Age is the name given to the period in the 3rd millennium BC when Egypt attained its first continuous peak of civilization in complexity and achievement – the first of three "Kingdom" periods, which mark the high points of civilization in the lower Nile Valley (the others being Middle Kingdom and the New Kingdom).

The First Intermediate Period of Egypt, often described as a "dark period" in ancient Egyptian history, spanned about 100 years after the end of the Old Kingdom from about 2181 to 2055 BC. Very little monumental evidence survives from this period, especially from the early part of it. The First Intermediate Period was a dynamic time when the rule of Egypt was roughly divided between two competing for power bases: Heracleopolis in Lower Egypt and Thebes in Upper Egypt. These two kingdoms would eventually come into conflict, with the Theban kings conquering the north, resulting in the reunification of Egypt under a single ruler during the second part of the 11th Dynasty.

Nubia 
The Bronze Age in Nubia started as early as 2300 BC. Copper smelting was introduced by Egyptians to the Nubian city of Meroë, in modern-day Sudan, around 2600 BC. A furnace for bronze casting has been found in Kerma that is dated to 2300–1900 BC.

Middle Bronze dynasties 
The Middle Kingdom of Egypt lasted from 2055 to 1650 BC. During this period, the Osiris funerary cult rose to dominate Egyptian popular religion. The period comprises two phases: the 11th Dynasty, which ruled from Thebes and the 12th and 13th Dynasties centered on el-Lisht. The unified kingdom was previously considered to comprise the 11th and 12th Dynasties, but historians now at least partially consider the 13th Dynasty to belong to the Middle Kingdom.

During the Second Intermediate Period, Ancient Egypt fell into disarray for a second time, between the end of the Middle Kingdom and the start of the New Kingdom. It is best known for the Hyksos, whose reign comprised the 15th and 16th dynasties. The Hyksos first appeared in Egypt during the 11th Dynasty, began their climb to power in the 13th Dynasty, and emerged from the Second Intermediate Period in control of Avaris and the Delta. By the 15th Dynasty, they ruled lower Egypt, and they were expelled at the end of the 17th Dynasty.

Late Bronze dynasties 
The New Kingdom of Egypt, also referred to as the Egyptian Empire, lasted from the 16th to the 11th century BC. The New Kingdom followed the Second Intermediate Period and was succeeded by the Third Intermediate Period. It was Egypt's most prosperous time and marked the peak of Egypt's power. The later New Kingdom, i.e. the 19th and 20th Dynasties (1292–1069 BC), is also known as the Ramesside period, after the eleven pharaohs that took the name of Ramesses.

Iranian Plateau 

Elam was a pre-Iranian ancient civilization located to the east of Mesopotamia. In the Old Elamite period (Middle Bronze Age), Elam consisted of kingdoms on the Iranian Plateau, centered in Anshan, and from the mid-2nd millennium BC, it was centered in Susa in the Khuzestan lowlands. Its culture played a crucial role in the Gutian Empire and especially during the Iranian Achaemenid dynasty that succeeded it.

The Oxus civilization was a Bronze Age Central Asian culture dated to  2300–1700 BC and centered on the upper Amu Darya (Oxus). In the Early Bronze Age, the culture of the Kopet Dag oases and Altyndepe developed a proto-urban society. This corresponds to level IV at Namazga-Tepe. Altyndepe was a major center even then. Pottery was wheel-turned. Grapes were grown. The height of this urban development was reached in the Middle Bronze Age  2300 BC, corresponding to level V at Namazga-Depe. This Bronze Age culture is called the Bactria–Margiana Archaeological Complex (BMAC).

The Kulli culture, similar to those of the Indus Valley civilisation, was located in southern Balochistan (Gedrosia)  2500–2000 BC. Agriculture was the economic base of these people. At several places, dams were found, providing evidence for a highly developed water management system.

Konar Sandal is associated with the hypothesized "Jiroft culture", a 3rd-millennium-BC culture postulated based on a collection of artifacts confiscated in 2001.

Levant 

In modern scholarship, the chronology of the Bronze Age Levant is divided into Early/Proto Syrian; corresponding to the Early Bronze. Old Syrian; corresponding to the Middle Bronze. Middle Syrian; corresponding to the Late Bronze. The term Neo-Syria is used to designate the early Iron Age.

The old Syrian period was dominated by the Eblaite first kingdom, Nagar and the Mariote second kingdom. The Akkadians conquered large areas of the Levant and were followed by the Amorite kingdoms,  2000–1600 BC, which arose in Mari, Yamhad, Qatna, Assyria. From the 15th century BC onward, the term Amurru is usually applied to the region extending north of Canaan as far as Kadesh on the Orontes River.

The earliest-known Ugaritic contact with Egypt (and the first exact dating of Ugaritic civilization) comes from a carnelian bead identified with the Middle Kingdom pharaoh Senusret I, 1971–1926 BC. A stela and a statuette from the Egyptian pharaohs Senusret III and Amenemhet III have also been found. However, it is unclear at what time these monuments got to Ugarit. In the Amarna letters, messages from Ugarit  1350 BC written by Ammittamru I, Niqmaddu II, and his queen, were discovered. From the 16th to the 13th century BC, Ugarit remained in constant touch with Egypt and Cyprus (named Alashiya).

The Mitanni was a loosely organized state in northern Syria and south-east Anatolia from  1500–1300 BC. Founded by an Indo-Aryan ruling class that governed a predominantly Hurrian population, Mitanni came to be a regional power after the Hittite destruction of Kassite Babylon created a power vacuum in Mesopotamia. At its beginning, Mitanni's major rival was Egypt under the Thutmosids. However, with the ascent of the Hittite empire, Mitanni and Egypt allied to protect their mutual interests from the threat of Hittite domination. At the height of its power, during the 14th century BC, it had outposts centered on its capital, Washukanni, which archaeologists have located on the headwaters of the Khabur River. Eventually, Mitanni succumbed to Hittite, and later Assyrian attacks, and was reduced to a province of the Middle Assyrian Empire.

The Israelites were an ancient Semitic-speaking people of the Ancient Near East who inhabited part of Canaan during the tribal and monarchic periods (15th to 6th centuries BC), and lived in the region in smaller numbers after the fall of the monarchy. The name "Israel" first appears  1209 BC, at the end of the Late Bronze Age and the very beginning of the Iron Age, on the Merneptah Stele raised by the Egyptian pharaoh Merneptah.

The Aramaeans were a Northwest Semitic semi-nomadic and pastoralist people who originated in what is now modern Syria (Biblical Aram) during the Late Bronze Age and the early Iron Age. Large groups migrated to Mesopotamia, where they intermingled with the native Akkadian (Assyrian and Babylonian) population. The Aramaeans never had a unified empire; they were divided into independent kingdoms all across the Near East. After the Bronze Age collapse, their political influence was confined to many Syro-Hittite states, which were entirely absorbed into the Neo-Assyrian Empire by the 8th century BC.

Mesopotamia 

The Mesopotamian Bronze Age began about 3500 BC and ended with the Kassite period ( 1500 BC –  1155 BC). The usual tripartite division into an Early, Middle and Late Bronze Age is not used. Instead, a division primarily based on art-historical and historical characteristics is more common.

The cities of the Ancient Near East housed several tens of thousands of people. Ur, Kish, Isin, Larsa and Nippur in the Middle Bronze Age and Babylon, Calah and Assur in the Late Bronze Age similarly had large populations. The Akkadian Empire (2335–2154 BC) became the dominant power in the region, and after its fall the Sumerians enjoyed a renaissance with the Neo-Sumerian Empire. Assyria became a regional power, under the Amorite king Shamshi-Adad I, with the Old Assyrian Empire ( 1800–1600 BC). The earliest mention of Babylon (then a small administrative town) appears on a tablet from the reign of Sargon of Akkad in the 23rd century BC. The Amorite dynasty established the city-state of Babylon in the 19th century BC. Over 100 years later, it briefly took over the other city-states and formed the short-lived First Babylonian Empire during what is also called the Old Babylonian Period. Akkad, Assyria, and Babylonia all used the written East Semitic Akkadian language for official use and as a spoken language. By that time, the Sumerian language was no longer spoken, but was still in religious use in Assyria and Babylonia, and would remain so until the 1st century AD. The Akkadian and Sumerian traditions played a major role in later Assyrian and Babylonian culture, even though Babylonia (unlike the more militarily powerful Assyria) itself was founded by non-native Amorites and often ruled by other non-indigenous peoples, such as Kassites, Aramaeans and Chaldeans, as well as its Assyrian neighbors.

Asia

Central Asia

Agropastoralism 
For many decades scholars made superficial reference to Central Asia as the "pastoral realm" or alternatively, the "nomadic world", in what researchers have come to call the "Central Asian void": a 5,000 year span that was neglected in studies of the origins of agriculture. Foothill regions and glacial melt streams supported Bronze Age agropastoralists who developed complex east–west trade routes between Central Asia and China that introduced wheat and barley to China and spread millet across Central Asia.

Bactria–Margiana Archaeological Complex 

The Bactria–Margiana Archaeological Complex (BMAC), also known as the Oxus civilization, was a Bronze Age civilization in Central Asia, dated to c. 2400–1600 BC, located in present-day northern Afghanistan, eastern Turkmenistan, southern Uzbekistan and western Tajikistan, centred on the upper Amu Darya (Oxus River). Its sites were discovered and named by the Soviet archaeologist Viktor Sarianidi (1976). Bactria was the Greek name for the area of Bactra (modern Balkh), in what is now northern Afghanistan, and Margiana was the Greek name for the Persian satrapy of Marguš, the capital of which was Merv, in modern-day southeastern Turkmenistan.

A wealth of information indicates that the BMAC had close international relations with the Indus Valley, the Iranian Plateau, and possibly even indirectly with Mesopotamia, and all civilizations were very familiar with lost wax casting.

According to recent studies, the BMAC was not a primary contributor to later South-Asian genetics.

Seima-Turbino phenomenon 

The Altai Mountains in what is now southern Russia and central Mongolia have been identified as the point of origin of a cultural enigma termed the Seima-Turbino Phenomenon. It is conjectured that changes in climate in this region around 2000 BC and the ensuing ecological, economic and political changes triggered a rapid and massive migration westward into northeast Europe, eastward into China and southward into Vietnam and Thailand
 across a frontier of some 4,000 miles. This migration took place in just five to six generations and led to peoples from Finland in the west to Thailand in the east employing the same metal working technology and, in some areas, horse breeding and riding. It is further conjectured that the same migrations spread the Uralic group of languages across Europe and Asia: some 39 languages of this group are still extant, including Hungarian, Finnish and Estonian. However, recent genetic testings of sites in south Siberia and Kazakhstan (Andronovo horizon) would rather support a spreading of the bronze technology via Indo-European migrations eastwards, as this technology was well known for quite a while in western regions.

East Asia

China 

In China, the earliest bronze artifacts have been found in the Majiayao culture site (between 3100 and 2700 BC).

The term "Bronze Age" has been transferred to the archaeology of China from that of Western Eurasia, and there is no consensus or universally used convention delimiting the "Bronze Age" in the context of Chinese prehistory.

By convention, the "Early Bronze Age" in China is sometimes taken as equivalent to the "Shang dynasty" period (16th to 11th centuries BC), and the "Later Bronze Age" as equivalent to the "Zhou dynasty" period (11th to 3rd centuries BC, from the 5th century, also dubbed "Iron Age"), although there is an argument to be made that the "Bronze Age" proper never ended in China, as there is no recognizable transition to an "Iron Age". Significantly, together with the jade art that precedes it, bronze was seen as a "fine" material for ritual art when compared with iron or stone.

Bronze metallurgy in China originated in what is referred to as the Erlitou period, which some historians argue places it within the range of dates controlled by the Shang dynasty. Others believe the Erlitou sites belong to the preceding Xia dynasty. The U.S. National Gallery of Art defines the Chinese Bronze Age as the "period between about 2000 BC and 771 BC", a period that begins with the Erlitou culture and ends abruptly with the disintegration of Western Zhou rule.

There is reason to believe that bronze work developed inside China separately from outside influence. However, the discovery of Europoid mummies in Xinjiang has caused some scholars such as Johan Gunnar Andersson, Jan Romgard, and An Zhimin to suggest a possible route of transmission from the West eastwards. According to An Zhimin, "It can be imagined that initially bronze and iron technology took its rise in West Asia, first influenced the Xinjiang region, and then reached the Yellow River valley, providing external impetus for the rise of the Shang and Zhou civilizations." According to Jan Romgard, "bronze and iron tools seems to have traveled from west to east as well as the use of wheeled wagons and the domestication of the horse." There are also possible links to Seima-Turbino culture, "a transcultural complex across northern Eurasia," the Eurasian steppe, and the Urals. However the oldest bronze objects found in China so far were discovered at the Majiayao site in Gansu rather than at Xinjiang.

The Shang dynasty (also known as the Yin dynasty) of the Yellow River Valley rose to power after the Xia dynasty around 1600 BC. While some direct information about the Shang dynasty comes from Shang-era inscriptions on bronze artifacts, most comes from oracle bones—turtle shells, cattle scapulae, or other bones—which bear glyphs that form the first significant corpus of recorded Chinese characters.

The production of Erlitou in Henan represents the earliest large-scale metallurgy industry in the Central Plains of China. The influence of the Saima-Turbino metalworking tradition from the north is supported by a series of recent discoveries in China of many unique perforated spearheads with downward hooks and small loops on the same or opposite side of the socket, which could be associated with the Seima-Turbino visual vocabulary of southern Siberia. The metallurgical centers of northwestern China, especially Qijia in Gansu and Kexingzhuang culture in Shaanxi, played an intermediary role in this process.

Iron has been found from the Zhou dynasty, but its use was minimal. Chinese literature dating to the 6th century BC attests knowledge of iron smelting, yet bronze continues to occupy the seat of significance in the archaeological and historical record for some time after this. Historian W.C. White argues that iron did not supplant bronze "at any period before the end of the Zhou dynasty (256 BC)" and that bronze vessels make up the majority of metal vessels through the Later Han period, or to 221 BC.

The Chinese bronze artifacts generally are either utilitarian, like spear points or adze heads, or "ritual bronzes", which are more elaborate versions in precious materials of everyday vessels, as well as tools and weapons. Examples are the numerous large sacrificial tripods known as dings in Chinese; there are many other distinct shapes. Surviving identified Chinese ritual bronzes tend to be highly decorated, often with the taotie motif, which involves highly stylized animal faces. These appear in three main motif types: those of demons, of symbolic animals, and abstract symbols. Many large bronzes also bear cast inscriptions that are the great bulk of the surviving body of early Chinese writing and have helped historians and archaeologists piece together the history of China, especially during the Zhou dynasty (1046–256 BC).

The bronzes of the Western Zhou dynasty document large portions of history not found in the extant texts that were often composed by persons of varying rank and possibly even social class. Further, the medium of cast bronze lends the record they preserve a permanence not enjoyed by manuscripts. These inscriptions can commonly be subdivided into four parts: a reference to the date and place, the naming of the event commemorated, the list of gifts given to the artisan in exchange for the bronze, and a dedication. The relative points of reference these vessels provide have enabled historians to place most of the vessels within a certain time frame of the Western Zhou period, allowing them to trace the evolution of the vessels and the events they record.

Korea 

The beginning of the Bronze Age on the peninsula is around 1000–800 BC. Initially centered around Liaoning and southern Manchuria, Korean Bronze Age culture exhibits unique typology and styles, especially in ritual objects.

The Mumun pottery period is named after the Korean name for undecorated or plain cooking and storage vessels that form a large part of the pottery assemblage over the entire length of the period, but especially 850–550 BC. The Mumun period is known for the origins of intensive agriculture and complex societies in both the Korean Peninsula and the Japanese Archipelago.

The Middle Mumun pottery period culture of the southern Korean Peninsula gradually adopted bronze production ( 700–600? BC) after a period when Liaoning-style bronze daggers and other bronze artifacts were exchanged as far as the interior part of the Southern Peninsula ( 900–700 BC). The bronze daggers lent prestige and authority to the personages who wielded and were buried with them in high-status megalithic burials at south-coastal centers such as the Igeum-dong site. Bronze was an important element in ceremonies and as for mortuary offerings until 100 BC.

Japan 

The Japanese archipelago saw the introduction of bronze during the beginning of the Early Yayoi period (≈300 BC), which saw the introduction of metalworking and agricultural practices brought in by settlers arriving from the continent. Bronze and iron smelting techniques spread to the Japanese archipelago through contact with other ancient East Asian civilizations, particularly immigration and trade from ancient Korean peninsula and ancient mainland China. Iron was mainly used for agricultural and other tools, whereas ritual and ceremonial artifacts were mainly made of bronze.

South Asia 
(Dates are approximate, consult particular article for details)

Indus Valley 

The Bronze Age on the Indian subcontinent began around 3300 BC with the beginning of the Indus Valley civilization. Inhabitants of the Indus Valley, the Harappans, developed new techniques in metallurgy and produced copper, bronze, lead and tin. The Late Harappan culture, which dates from 1900 to 1400 BC, overlapped the transition from the Bronze Age to the Iron Age; thus it is difficult to date this transition accurately. It has been claimed that a 6,000-year-old copper amulet manufactured in Mehrgarh in the shape of wheel spoke is the earliest example of lost-wax casting in the world.

The civilization's cities were noted for their urban planning, baked brick houses, elaborate drainage systems, water supply systems, clusters of large non-residential buildings, and new techniques in handicraft (carnelian products, seal carving) and metallurgy (copper, bronze, lead, and tin). The large cities of Mohenjo-daro and Harappa very likely grew to contain between 30,000 and 60,000 individuals, and the civilization itself during its florescence may have contained between one and five million individuals.

Southeast Asia 
The Vilabouly Complex in Laos is a significant archaeological site for dating the origin of bronze metallurgy in Southeast Asia.

Thailand 
In Ban Chiang, Thailand, (Southeast Asia) bronze artifacts have been discovered dating to 2100 BC. However, according to the radiocarbon dating on the human and pig bones in Ban Chiang, some scholars propose that the initial Bronze Age in Ban Chiang was in late 2nd millennium. In Nyaunggan, Burma, bronze tools have been excavated along with ceramics and stone artifacts. Dating is still currently broad (3500–500 BC). Ban Non Wat, excavated by Charles Higham, was a rich site with over 640 graves excavated that gleaned many complex bronze items that may have had social value connected to them.

Ban Chiang, however, is the most thoroughly documented site while having the clearest evidence of metallurgy when it comes to Southeast Asia. With a rough date range of late 3rd millennium BC to the first millennium AD, this site alone has various artifacts such as burial pottery (dating from 2100 to 1700 BC), fragments of Bronze, copper-base bangles, and much more. What's interesting about this site, however, is not just the old age of the artifacts but that this technology suggested on-site casting from the very beginning. The on-site casting supports the theory that Bronze was first introduced in Southeast Asia as fully developed which therefore shows that Bronze was innovated from a different country. Some scholars believe that the copper-based metallurgy was disseminated from northwest and central China via south and southwest areas such as Guangdong province and Yunnan province and finally into southeast Asia around 1000 BC. Archaeology also suggests that Bronze Age metallurgy may not have been as significant a catalyst in social stratification and warfare in Southeast Asia as in other regions, social distribution shifting away from chiefdom-states to a heterarchical network. Data analyses of sites such as Ban Lum Khao, Ban Na Di, Non-Nok Tha, Khok Phanom Di, and Nong Nor have consistently led researchers to conclude that there was no entrenched hierarchy.

Vietnam 

Dating back to the Neolithic Age, the first bronze drum, called the Dong Son drum, were uncovered in and around the Red River Delta regions of Northern Vietnam and Southern China. These relate to the Dong Son culture of Vietnam.

Archaeological research in Northern Vietnam indicates an increase in rates of infectious disease following the advent of metallurgy; skeletal fragments in sites dating to the early and mid-Bronze Age evidence a greater proportion of lesions than in sites of earlier periods. There are a few possible implications of this. One is the increased contact with bacterial and/or fungal pathogens due to increased population density and land clearing/cultivation. The other one is decreased levels of immunocompetence in the Metal age due to changes in the diet caused by agriculture. The last is that there may have been an emergence of infectious disease in the Da But the period that evolved into a more virulent form in the metal period.

Myanmar

Europe 

A few examples of named Bronze Age cultures in Europe in roughly relative order.
(Dates are approximate, consult particular article for details)

The chosen cultures overlapped in time and the indicated periods do not fully correspond to their estimated extents.

Aegean 

The Aegean Bronze Age began around 3200 BC, when civilizations first established a far-ranging trade network. This network imported tin and charcoal to Cyprus, where copper was mined and alloyed with the tin to produce bronze. Bronze objects were then exported far and wide and supported the trade. Isotopic analysis of tin in some Mediterranean bronze artifacts suggests that they may have originated from Great Britain.

Knowledge of navigation was well developed at this time and reached a peak of skill not exceeded (except perhaps by Polynesian sailors) until 1730 when the invention of the chronometer enabled the precise determination of longitude.

The Minoan civilization based in Knossos on the island of Crete appears to have coordinated and defended its Bronze Age trade. Ancient empires valued luxury goods in contrast to staple foods, leading to famine.

Aegean collapse 

Bronze Age collapse theories have described aspects of the end of the Bronze Age in this region. At the end of the Bronze Age in the Aegean region, the Mycenaean administration of the regional trade empire followed the decline of Minoan primacy. Several Minoan client states lost much of their population to famine and/or pestilence. This would indicate that the trade network may have failed, preventing the trade that would previously have relieved such famines and prevented illness caused by malnutrition. It is also known that in this era the breadbasket of the Minoan empire, the area north of the Black Sea, also suddenly lost much of its population, and thus probably some capacity to cultivate crops. Drought and famine in Anatolia may have also led to the Aegean collapse by disrupting trade networks, and therefore preventing the Aegean from accessing bronze and luxury goods.

The Aegean collapse has been attributed to the exhaustion of the Cypriot forests causing the end of the bronze trade. These forests are known to have existed into later times, and experiments have shown that charcoal production on the scale necessary for the bronze production of the late Bronze Age would have exhausted them in less than fifty years.

The Aegean collapse has also been attributed to the fact that as iron tools became more common, the main justification for the tin trade ended, and that trade network ceased to function as it did formerly. The colonies of the Minoan empire then suffered drought, famine, war, or some combination of those three, and had no access to the distant resources of an empire by which they could easily recover.

Speculation includes that a tsunami from Thera (more commonly known today as Santorini) destroyed Cretan cities. A tsunami may have destroyed the Cretan navy in its home harbor, which then lost crucial naval battles; so that in the LMIB/LMII event ( 1450 BC) the cities of Crete burned and the Mycenaean civilization took over Knossos. If the eruption occurred in the late 17th century BC (as most chronologists now think) then its immediate effects belong to the Middle to Late Bronze Age transition, and not to the end of the Late Bronze Age, but it could have triggered the instability that led to the collapse first of Knossos and then of Bronze Age society overall. One such theory highlights the role of Cretan expertise in administering the empire, post—Thera. If this expertise was concentrated in Crete, then the Mycenaeans may have made political and commercial mistakes in administering the Cretan empire.

Archaeological findings, including some on the island of Thera, suggest that the center of the Minoan civilization at the time of the eruption was actually on Thera rather than on Crete. According to this theory, the catastrophic loss of the political, administrative and economic center due to the eruption, as well as the damage wrought by the tsunami to the coastal towns and villages of Crete precipitated the decline of the Minoans. A weakened political entity with a reduced economic and military capability and fabled riches would have then been more vulnerable to conquest. Indeed, the Santorini eruption is usually dated to  1630 BC, while the Mycenaean Greeks first enter the historical record a few decades later,  1600 BC. The later Mycenaean assaults on Crete ( 1450 BC) and Troy ( 1250 BC) would have been a continuation of the steady encroachment of the Greeks upon the weakened Minoan world.

Balkans 

Radivojevic et al. (2013) reported the discovery of a tin bronze foil from the Pločnik archaeological site securely dated to c. 4650 BC as well as 14 other artifacts from Serbia and Bulgaria dated to before 4000 BC has shown that early tin bronze was more common than previously thought, and developed independently in Europe 1500 years before the first tin bronze alloys in the Near East. The production of complex tin bronzes lasted for c. 500 years in the Balkans. The authors reported that evidence for the production of such complex bronzes disappears at the end of the 5th millennium coinciding with the "collapse of large cultural complexes in north-eastern Bulgaria and Thrace in the late fifth millennium BC". Tin bronzes using cassiterite tin would be reintroduced to the area again some 1500 years later.

The Dabene Treasure was unearthed from 2004 to 2007 near Karlovo, Plovdiv Province, central Bulgaria. The whole treasure consists of 20,000 gold jewelry items from 18 to 23 carats. The most important of them was a dagger made of gold and platinum with an unusual edge. The treasure was dated to the end of the 3rd millennium B.C. The scientists suggest that the Karlovo valley used to be a major crafts center which exported golden jewelry all over Europe. It is considered as one of the largest prehistoric golden treasure in the world.

Central Europe 

In Central Europe, the early Bronze Age Unetice culture (2300–1600 BC) includes numerous smaller groups like the Straubing, Adlerberg and Hatvan cultures. Some very rich burials, such as the one located at Leubingen with grave gifts crafted from gold, point to an increase of social stratification already present in the Unetice culture. All in all, cemeteries of this period are rare and of small size. The Unetice culture is followed by the middle Bronze Age (1600–1200 BC) Tumulus culture, which is characterised by inhumation burials in tumuli (barrows). In the eastern Hungarian Körös tributaries, the early Bronze Age first saw the introduction of the Mako culture, followed by the Otomani and Gyulavarsand cultures.

The late Bronze Age Urnfield culture (1300–700 BC) is characterized by cremation burials. It includes the Lusatian culture in eastern Germany and Poland (1300–500 BC) that continues into the Iron Age. The Central European Bronze Age is followed by the Iron Age Hallstatt culture (700–450 BC).

Important sites include:
 Biskupin (Poland)
 Nebra (Germany)
 Vráble (Slovakia)
 Zug-Sumpf, Zug, Switzerland

The Bronze Age in Central Europe has been described in the chronological schema of German prehistorian Paul Reinecke. He described Bronze A1 (Bz A1) period (2300–2000 BC: triangular daggers, flat axes, stone wrist-guards, flint arrowheads) and Bronze A2 (Bz A2) period (1950–1700 BC: daggers with metal hilt, flanged axes, halberds, pins with perforated spherical heads, solid bracelets) and phases Hallstatt A and B (Ha A and B).

South Europe 

The Apennine culture (also called Italian Bronze Age) is a technology complex of central and southern Italy spanning the Chalcolithic and Bronze Age proper. The Camuni were an ancient people of uncertain origin (according to Pliny the Elder, they were Euganei; according to Strabo, they were Rhaetians) who lived in Val Camonica—in what is now northern Lombardy—during the Iron Age, although human groups of hunters, shepherds and farmers are known to have lived in the area since the Neolithic.

Located in Sardinia and Corsica, the Nuragic civilization lasted from the early Bronze Age (18th century BC) to the 2nd century AD, when the islands were already Romanized. They take their name from the characteristic Nuragic towers, which evolved from the pre-existing megalithic culture, which built dolmens and menhirs. 

The nuraghe towers are unanimously considered the best-preserved and largest megalithic remains in Europe. Their effective use is still debated: some scholars considered them as monumental tombs, others as Houses of the Giants, other as fortresses, ovens for metal fusion, prisons or, finally, temples for a solar cult. Around the end of the 3rd millennium BC, Sardinia exported towards Sicily a Culture that built small dolmens, trilithic or polygonal shaped, that served as tombs as it has been ascertained in the Sicilian dolmen of "Cava dei Servi". From this region, they reached Malta island and other countries of Mediterranean basin.

The Terramare was an early Indo-European civilization in the area of what is now Pianura Padana (northern Italy) before the arrival of the Celts and in other parts of Europe. They lived in square villages of wooden stilt houses. These villages were built on land, but generally near a stream, with roads that crossed each other at right angles. The whole complex denoted the nature of a fortified settlement. Terramare was widespread in the Pianura Padana (especially along the Panaro river, between Modena and Bologna) and in the rest of Europe. The civilization developed in the Middle and Late Bronze Age, between the 17th and the 13th centuries BC.

The Castellieri culture developed in Istria during the Middle Bronze Age. It lasted for more than a millennium, from the 15th century BC until the Roman conquest in the 3rd century BC. It takes its name from the fortified boroughs (Castellieri, Friulian: cjastelir) that characterized the culture. The Canegrate culture developed from the mid-Bronze Age (13th century BC) until the Iron Age in the Pianura Padana, in what are now western Lombardy, eastern Piedmont and Ticino. It takes its name from the township of Canegrate where, in the 20th century, some fifty tombs with ceramics and metal objects were found. The Canegrate culture migrated from the northwest part of the Alps and descended to Pianura Padana from the Swiss Alps passes and the Ticino.

The Golasecca culture developed starting from the late Bronze Age in the Po plain. It takes its name from Golasecca, a locality next to the Ticino where, in the early 19th century, abbot Giovanni Battista Giani excavated its first findings (some fifty tombs with ceramics and metal objects). Remains of the Golasecca culture span an area of c. 20,000 square kilometers south to the Alps, between the Po, Sesia and Serio rivers, dating from the 9th to the 4th century BC.

West Europe

Great Britain 

In Great Britain, the Bronze Age is considered to have been the period from around 2100 to 750 BC. Migration brought new people to the islands from the continent. Recent tooth enamel isotope research on bodies found in early Bronze Age graves around Stonehenge indicates that at least some of the migrants came from the area of modern Switzerland. Another example site is Must Farm, near Whittlesey, which has recently been host to the most complete Bronze Age wheel ever to be found. The Beaker culture displayed different behaviors from the earlier Neolithic people, and cultural change was significant. Integration is thought to have been peaceful, as many of the early henge sites were seemingly adopted by the newcomers. The rich Wessex culture developed in southern Britain at this time. Additionally, the climate was deteriorating; where once the weather was warm and dry it became much wetter as the Bronze Age continued, forcing the population away from easily defended sites in the hills and into the fertile valleys. Large livestock farms developed in the lowlands and appear to have contributed to economic growth and inspired increasing forest clearances. The Deverel-Rimbury culture began to emerge in the second half of the Middle Bronze Age ( 1400–1100 BC) to exploit these conditions. Devon and Cornwall were major sources of tin for much of western Europe and copper was extracted from sites such as the Great Orme mine in northern Wales. Social groups appear to have been tribal but with growing complexity and hierarchies becoming apparent.

The burial of the dead (which, until this period, had usually been communal) became more individual. For example, whereas in the Neolithic a large chambered cairn or long barrow housed the dead, Early Bronze Age people buried their dead in individual barrows (also commonly known and marked on modern British Ordnance Survey maps as tumuli), or sometimes in cists covered with cairns.

The greatest quantities of bronze objects in England were discovered in East Cambridgeshire, where the most important finds were recovered in Isleham (more than 6500 pieces).
Alloying of copper with zinc or tin to make brass or bronze was practiced soon after the discovery of copper itself. One copper mine at Great Orme in North Wales, extended to a depth of 70 meters. At Alderley Edge in Cheshire, carbon dates have established mining at around 2280 to 1890 BC (at 95% probability). The earliest identified metalworking site (Sigwells, Somerset) is much later, dated by Globular Urn style pottery to approximately the 12th century BC. The identifiable sherds from over 500 mould fragments included a perfect fit of the hilt of a sword in the Wilburton style held in Somerset County Museum.

Atlantic Bronze Age 

The Atlantic Bronze Age is a cultural complex of the period of approximately 1300–700 BC that includes different cultures in Portugal, Andalusia, Galicia, and Britain and Ireland. It is marked by economic and cultural exchange. Commercial contacts extend to Denmark and the Mediterranean. The Atlantic Bronze Age was defined by many distinct regional centers of metal production, unified by a regular maritime exchange of some of their products.

Ireland 

The Bronze Age in Ireland commenced around 2000 BC when copper was alloyed with tin and used to manufacture Ballybeg type flat axes and associated metalwork. The preceding period is known as the Copper Age and is characterised by the production of flat axes, daggers, halberds and awls in copper. The period is divided into three phases: Early Bronze Age (2000–1500 BC), Middle Bronze Age (1500–1200 BC), and Late Bronze Age (1200– 500 BC). Ireland is also known for a relatively large number of Early Bronze Age burials.

One of the characteristic types of artifact of the Early Bronze Age in Ireland is the flat axe. There are five main types of flat axes: Lough Ravel ( 2200 BC), Ballybeg ( 2000 BC), Killaha ( 2000 BC), Ballyvalley ( 2000–1600 BC), Derryniggin ( 1600 BC), and a number of metal ingots in the shape of axes.

North Europe 

The Bronze Age in Northern Europe spans the entire 2nd millennium BC (Unetice culture, Urnfield culture, Tumulus culture, Terramare culture, Lusatian culture) lasting until  600 BC. The Northern Bronze Age was both a period and a Bronze Age culture in Scandinavian pre-history,  1700–500 BC, with sites that reached as far east as Estonia. Succeeding the Late Neolithic culture, its ethnic and linguistic affinities are unknown in the absence of written sources. It is followed by the Pre-Roman Iron Age.

Even though Northern European Bronze Age cultures were relatively late, and came into existence via trade, sites present rich and well-preserved objects made of wool, wood and imported Central European bronze and gold. Many rock carvings depict ships, and the large stone burial monuments known as stone ships suggest that shipping played an important role. Thousands of rock carvings depict ships, most probably representing sewn plank built canoes for warfare, fishing, and trade. These may have a history as far back as the neolithic period and continue into the Pre-Roman Iron Age, as shown by the Hjortspring boat. There are many mounds and rock carving sites from the period. Numerous artifacts of bronze and gold are found. No written language existed in the Nordic countries during the Bronze Age. The rock carvings have been dated through comparison with depicted artifacts.

Caucasus 
Arsenical bronze artifacts of the Maykop culture in the North Caucasus have been dated around the 4th millennium BC. This innovation resulted in the circulation of arsenical bronze technology over southern and eastern Europe.

Pontic–Caspian steppe 

The Yamnaya culture is a Late Copper Age/Early Bronze Age culture of the Southern Bug/Dniester/Ural region (the Pontic steppe), dating to the 36th–23rd centuries BC. The name also appears in English as Pit-Grave Culture or Ochre-Grave Culture. The Catacomb culture,  2800–2200 BC, comprises several related Early Bronze Age cultures occupying what is presently Russia and Ukraine. The Srubnaya culture was a Late Bronze Age (18th–12th centuries BC) culture. It is a successor to the Yamnaya and the Poltavka culture.

Africa

Sub-Saharan Africa 

Iron and copper smelting appeared around the same time in most parts of Africa. As such, most African civilizations outside of Egypt did not experience a distinct Bronze Age. Evidence for iron smelting appears earlier or at the same time as copper smelting in Nigeria c. 900–800 BC, Rwanda and Burundi c. 700–500 BC and Tanzania c. 300 BC.

There is a longstanding debate about whether the development of both copper and iron metallurgy were independently developed in sub-Saharan Africa or were introduced from the outside across the Sahara Desert from North Africa or the Indian Ocean. Evidence for theories of independent development and outside introduction are scarce and subject to active scholarly debate. Scholars have suggested that both the relative dearth of archeological research in sub-Saharan Africa as well as long-standing prejudices have limited or biased our understanding of pre-historic metallurgy on the continent. One scholar characterized the state of historical knowledge as such: "To say that the history of metallurgy in sub-Saharan Africa is complicated is perhaps an understatement."

West Africa 
Copper smelting took place in West Africa prior to the appearance of iron smelting in the region. Evidence for copper smelting furnaces was found near Agadez, Niger that has been dated as early as 2200 BC. However, evidence for copper production in this region before 1000 BC is debated. Evidence of copper mining and smelting has been found at Akjoujt, Mauretania that suggests small scale production  800 to 400 BC.

Americas 

The Moche civilization of South America independently discovered and developed bronze smelting. Bronze technology was developed further by the Incas and used widely both for utilitarian objects and sculpture. A later appearance of limited bronze smelting in West Mexico suggests either contact of that region with Andean cultures or separate discovery of the technology. The Calchaquí people of Northwest Argentina had bronze technology.

Trade 
Trade and industry played a major role in the development of the ancient Bronze Age civilizations. With artifacts of the Indus Valley civilization being found in ancient Mesopotamia and Egypt, it is clear that these civilizations were not only in touch with each other but also trading with each other. Early long-distance trade was limited almost exclusively to luxury goods like spices, textiles and precious metals. Not only did this make cities with ample amounts of these products extremely rich but also led to an intermingling of cultures for the first time in history.

Trade routes were not only over land but also over water. The first and most extensive trade routes were over rivers such as the Nile, the Tigris and the Euphrates which led to growth of cities on the banks of these rivers. The domestication of camels at a later time also helped encourage the use of trade routes over land, linking the Indus Valley with the Mediterranean. This further led to towns sprouting up in numbers anywhere and everywhere there was a pit-stop or caravan-to-ship port.

See also 

 Altyndepe
 Dover Bronze Age Boat
 Ferriby Boats
 Hillfort
 Human timeline
 Langdon Bay hoard
 Middle Bronze Age migrations (Ancient Near East)
 Namazga
 Oxhide ingot
 Shropshire bulla
 Tollense valley battlefield

Notes

References 
 
 Eogan, George (1983). The hoards of the Irish later Bronze Age, Dublin: University College, 331 p., 
 Hall, David and Coles, John (1994). Fenland survey : an essay in landscape and persistence, Archaeological report 1, London : English Heritage, 170 p., 
 Pernicka, E., Eibner, C., Öztunah, Ö., Wagener, G.A. (2003). "Early Bronze Age Metallurgy in the Northeast Aegean", In: Wagner, G.A., Pernicka, E. and Uerpmann, H-P. (eds), Troia and the Troad: scientific approaches, Natural science in archaeology, Berlin; London : Springer, pp. 143–172
 Piccolo, Salvatore (2013). Ancient Stones: The Prehistoric Dolmens of Sicily. Abingdon (GB): Brazen Head Publishing,
 Waddell, John (1998). The prehistoric archaeology of Ireland, Galway University Press, 433 p.,

Further reading

External links 

 
 Links to the Bronze Age in Europe and beyond Commented web index, geographically structured (private website)
 Bronze Age Experimental Archeology and Museum Reproductions
 Umha Aois – Reconstructed Bronze Age metal casting
 Umha Aois – ancient bronze casting videoclip
 
 Aegean and Balkan Prehistory articles, site-reports and bibliography database concerning the Aegean, Balkans and Western Anatolia
 
 "The Transmission of Early Bronze Technology to Thailand: New Perspectives"
 Human Timeline (Interactive) – Smithsonian, National Museum of Natural History (August 2016).
Seafaring
 Divers unearth Bronze Age hoard off the coast of Devon

 
Articles which contain graphical timelines
Historical eras